Different Creatures is the second studio album by British indie rock band, Circa Waves. The album was released 10 March 2017 through Virgin EMI Records.  The Guardian newspaper's review labelled the album 'darker, denser' than their debut. ITunes: 'Growing star power and depth mark this Liverpool band’s second album'.

Reception

Track listing

Charting

References 

2017 albums
Circa Waves albums
Albums produced by Alan Moulder
Virgin EMI Records albums